Coulterville is a village in Randolph County, Illinois, United States. The population was 945 as of the 2010 census.

History
Coulterville was named for its founder, James B. Coulter.

Geography
Coulterville is located at  (38.184172, -89.605496).

Demographics

At the 2000 census there were 1,230 people, 514 households, and 360 families in the village. The racial makeup of the village was 96.34% White, 1.87% African American, 0.08% Native American, 0.33% Asian, 0.08% Pacific Islander, and 1.30% from two or more races. Hispanic or Latino of any race were 0.16%.

Of the 514 households 35.6% had children under the age of 18 living with them, 50.6% were married couples living together, 13.4% had a female householder with no husband present, and 29.8% were non-families. 26.5% of households were one person and 12.3% were one person aged 65 or older. The average household size was 2.39 and the average family size was 2.87.

The age distribution was 27.8% under the age of 18, 8.0% from 18 to 24, 28.5% from 25 to 44, 22.0% from 45 to 64, and 13.7% 65 or older. The median age was 36 years. For every 100 females, there were 93.1 males. For every 100 females age 18 and over, there were 95.6 males.

The median household income was $26,776 and the median family income  was $30,938. Males had a median income of $31,550 versus $19,113 for females. The per capita income for the village was $17,994. About 12.6% of families and 18.6% of the population were below the poverty line, including 31.4% of those under age 18 and 16.3% of those age 65 or over.

Notable people

 Vincent Birchler, Illinois educator and politician, was born in Coulterville
 Nick Kahl, second baseman for the Cleveland Naps
 George Khoury,  known for his organization of the Khoury League. George Khoury was born on the summer of 1900. To parents Salem and Lily Khoury who emigrated from the Middle East in 1898. He lives outside of Coulterville and worked at a printer press in town as a young man. Khoury moved to St. Louis and married Dorothy Smith in 1922. After having three sons, the couple wanted a way to keep the boys busy in the summer. In the summer of 1936, the first season of Khoury league was started, the first game was played on Mothers' Day. Khoury League got its start in Missouri, but by 1952 teams started playing in Illinois. In 1958, girls started teams in the league. Over the years the league expanded to soccer, basketball, softball, and bowling. The league also spread to other countries.

References

External links
Randolph County Herald Tribune - local newspaper
Coulterville School District
Coulterville Museum

Villages in Randolph County, Illinois
Villages in Illinois